The Novo Cemetery is a Grade II listed Sephardic Jewish cemetery located within the grounds of Queen Mary University of London in Mile End in the London Borough of Tower Hamlets. Opened in 1733, it is one of only two exclusively Sephardic cemeteries left in England.

History 
England's first Jewish cemetery, called the Velho Cemetery, was built on a small plot of land in Mile End in 1657. As the nearby Jewish community grew in size, and the Velho began to fill up. By 1726, it was nearly full, so land for a second, larger Sephardi cemetery, the Novo Cemetery, was leased, with the first burials taking place in 1733.

By 1895 the cemetery was almost full, and it was closed for burials for adults in 1905 and for children in 1918. Historic England added it to the register of listed buildings in 2014, as a Grade II.

Notable people 
One of the most notable people buried in the cemetery is the Rabbi and Kabbalist Shalom Buzaglo, also known as the "Mikdash Melech." He was born in Marrakesh, Morocco and raised in southern Morocco, which was then a kabbalistic center. He fled persecution by the sultan and settled in London, where he wrote and published numerous works on kabbalah, including the first systematic commentary on the Zohar.

Notable interments 
 Jacob de Castro Sarmento
 Daniel Mendoza
 Jacob Levi Montefiore
 Rabbi Benjamin Artom

See also
 Jewish cemeteries in the London area

References

External links 

 Information about the Novo Cemetery from Historic England

1733 establishments in England
Cemeteries in London
Grade II listed buildings in the London Borough of Tower Hamlets
Jewish cemeteries in the United Kingdom
Jews and Judaism in London
Mile End
Queen Mary University of London
Sephardi Jewish culture in the United Kingdom